Spiritual Healing is the third studio album by American death metal band Death, released on February 16, 1990, by Combat Records.  It is the band's only album to feature both guitarist James Murphy and bassist Terry Butler and the last to feature drummer Bill Andrews.

Overview
Spiritual Healing was the first of Death's albums to show Schuldiner's lyrics moving away from the gore and horror themes of previous works, focusing instead on themes of society and "real life horror", including serial killers, drug addiction, genetic reconstruction (influenced by a story on That's Incredible!), and faith healers.

The musical content is more obviously melodic, a facet highlighted by James Murphy's characteristic lead guitar playing. The members of Death and their manager/co-producer Eric Greif stayed in a single motel room at the Safari Inn, near Busch Gardens, for the entire six weeks the album was recorded and mixed, although bassist Terry Butler and drummer Bill Andrews frequently went home as they lived in the Tampa area.

This was the final Death album cover painted by Ed Repka. This period was one of massive controversy for Death, as Butler and Andrews toured Europe without Schuldiner (who refused to do the tour on the basis that it had been badly organised), with vocalist Louis Carrisalez in his place. Butler and Andrews left the band following the tour.

Greif played a Kawai K1 keyboard part in the middle of title track "Spiritual Healing".

The "joke & jam" tracks on the Spiritual Healing re-issue were a result of heat exhaustion, as the band was practicing in a mini warehouse in summer with no air conditioning. The band would play a few songs then stop, as they would be close to passing out from the intense heat.

The album had been out of print, but was reissued by Relapse Records in November 2012.

Track listing

Personnel
Death
 Chuck Schuldiner – vocals, guitar, producer
 James Murphy – guitar
 Terry Butler – bass
 Bill Andrews – drums

Production
 Eric Greif – producer, management, keyboard on "Spiritual Healing"
 Scott Burns and – engineer, mixing with Death
 John Cervini, Mike Gowan – assistant engineers
 Alan Douches – remastering at West West Side Music
 Edward Repka – artwork, cover design
 David Bett – art direction
 Brian Freeman – design
 J.J. Hollis – photography

References

External links
Spiritual Healing - Lyrics

1990 albums
Death (metal band) albums
Combat Records albums
Relapse Records albums
Albums recorded at Morrisound Recording
Albums with cover art by Ed Repka